Pouteria melanopoda is a species of plant in the family Sapotaceae. It is found in French Guiana and Suriname.

References

melanopoda
Least concern plants
Taxonomy articles created by Polbot